WLBN (1590 AM) is a US radio station, currently broadcasting an oldies format. The station is licensed to broadcast in Lebanon, Kentucky, United States, and is owned by Jonathan Smith, through licensee Choice Radio Central Corporation. It features programming from Jones Radio Network and Westwood One.

References

External links

LBN
Lebanon, Kentucky
1953 establishments in Kentucky
Radio stations established in 1953